(born 4 June 1940, in Tokyo) is a Japanese violinist.

Starting the violin at age 8, she won in 1956 the first prize and special award in The Music Competition of Japan, one of the most prestigious music contests in Japan. After that, she studied in the Musical Arts Academy of Prague in Czech Republic.

References

External links 
 

1940 births
Living people
Japanese classical violinists
20th-century classical violinists
21st-century classical violinists
Women classical violinists